State and Liberty Clothing (styled State & Liberty or S&L) is an American clothing e-commerce company that makes and sells athletic fit performance fabric menswear.

History
The company was founded in 2015 in Ann Arbor, Michigan by University of Michigan friends Steven Fisher and Lee Moffie, the current joint CEOs of the company. Moffie and Fisher both graduated from the university, where they met through Order of Angell, a senior honor society at the university. The two decided to name the company after an intersection in Ann Arbor, in honor of the town.

Prior to founding, Moffie played professional ice hockey for the Denver Cutthroats and the South Carolina Stingrays following his four-year varsity letter (2009–13) with the Michigan Wolverines Ice Hockey under Red Berenson. Fisher’s background lies in business data analytics and complex systems, leading a data analytics initiative for the Detroit Tigers and working on various other projects for startups and larger organizations as a consultant.

The idea for State & Liberty originated with Moffie and Fisher believing men with an athletic build wearing off-the-rack dress shirts lacked a professional look. Inspired by Lulu Lemon and athleisure apparel trends that stray away from traditional cotton fabric, the duo prototyped hundreds of fabrics and dress shirt fits on professional hockey players to accommodate their ‘V-shaped’ body type. Eventually, they settled with their athletic fitting dress shirt made from Athletic Performance Fabric (APF).

State and Liberty started as a fully self-funded small business. The company's product line includes athletic-fitting, moisture-wicking, and wrinkle-free dress shirts. In October 2016, State & Liberty launched a partnership with the Professional Hockey Players' Association.

In 2017, the company introduced multiple products, including a polo shirt, a long sleeve polo shirt, and an overcoat. State and Liberty opened two pop-up locations in late 2017, one on Newbury Street in Boston, Massachusetts and one in Georgetown, Washington D.C.

Philanthropy
State & Liberty supports Autism Speaks, sponsored by James van Riemsdyk, an NHL left winger for the Toronto Maple Leafs, by donating a portion of proceeds to the foundation. In mid-2016, State & Liberty launched "The Morgan" shirt to benefit the Jordan Morgan Foundation.  Later in 2016, State & Liberty launched ‘The Matzka’ dress shirt in support of Scott Matzka and to raise money for research on ALS.

References

External links
Official Website
Luxury Online Store
Tbmpoy Sports Apparel

Online clothing retailers of the United States